Densch is a German language surname. Notable people with the name include:

 Hermann Densch (1887–1963), German admiral
 Wayne Densch (1917–1994), American entrepreneur

References 

German-language surnames